The name Danielle has been used for eight tropical cyclones in the Atlantic Ocean:
 Tropical Storm Danielle (1980) – flooded the area of Beaumont-Port Arthur, Texas
 Tropical Storm Danielle (1986)  – caused light damage to the Windward Islands
 Tropical Storm Danielle (1992) – caused light damage when it hit the Delmarva Peninsula
 Hurricane Danielle (1998) – long-lived Category 2 Cape Verde hurricane that caused damage in the United Kingdom as an extratropical storm
 Hurricane Danielle (2004) – strong Category 2 hurricane that churned in the open eastern Atlantic
 Hurricane Danielle (2010) – long-lived Category 4 Cape Verde hurricane that did not cause damage to land
 Tropical Storm Danielle (2016) – short-lived storm that formed in the Bay of Campeche and made landfall in Veracruz, Mexico
 Hurricane Danielle (2022) – Category 1 hurricane that caused flooding and landslides in Portugal as an extratropical storm

Atlantic hurricane set index articles